The filmography of Stockard Channing comprises both film and television roles. In a career spanning over four decades, she has appeared in overall 47 feature films, 20 television films and ten television series.

Filmography

Film

Television

Other appearances

Theatrical plays

See also
 List of awards and nominations received by Stockard Channing

References

External links
 
 
 
 

Actress filmographies
American filmographies